Persoonia leucopogon is a species of flowering plant in the family Proteaceae and is endemic to Western Australia.

Description
Flowering occurs from November to March and the fruit is a smooth, more or less spherical drupe .

Taxonomy
Persoonia leucopogon was first formally described in 1899 by Spencer Le Marchant Moore in the Journal of the Linnean Society, Botany.

Distribution and habitat
This geebung usually grows in grows in heath but has only been collected at Bungalbin and at the type locality between Coolgardie and Laverton in the Avon Wheatbelt, Coolgardie and Murchison biogeographic regions.

Conservation status
This species is classified as "Priority One" by the Government of Western Australia Department of Parks and Wildlife, meaning that it is known from only one or a few locations which are potentially at risk.

References

leucopogon
Flora of Western Australia
Plants described in 1899
Taxa named by Spencer Le Marchant Moore